The Bombardment of Ancona was a naval engagement of the Adriatic Campaign of World War I between the navies of Italy and Austria-Hungary. Forces of the Imperial and Royal Navy attacked and bombarded military and civilian targets all across Ancona in central Italy and several other nearby islands and communities in response to Italy's declaration of war on Austria-Hungary.

When Italy declared war against Austria-Hungary on 23 May 1915, the Austrian fleet was quick to react; the navy launched several attacks on the Marche region of Italy. That day, the destroyer  and torpedo boat Tb 53T bombarded the port of Ancona. The destroyer , on a reconnaissance mission between Palagruža and Cape Gargano, shelled the semaphore and radio station at Vieste. Defending those waters at the time was the Italian destroyer . A small duel commenced with Lika coming out as the victor, damaging the enemy destroyer.

The next day, 24 May, the majority of the Austrian fleet at Pola steamed for the Adriatic coast of Italy. Other Austro-Hungarian ships were already in enemy waters or proceeding to the Ancona coast themselves. The fleet bombarded several of the Italian coastal cities and other targets in and around the Province of Ancona, especially damaging the city of Ancona.

SMS Tegetthoff and the destroyer  shelled the Italian airship Città di Ferrara off Ancona. The pre-dreadnought  and two torpedo boats bombarded Potenza Picena, then returned to Pola naval base. The pre-dreadnought —along with two more torpedo boats—bombarded Senigallia, destroying a train and damaging a railway station and a bridge, before returning to Pola. The torpedo boat  was unsuccessfully bombed by an Italian flying boat.

Austrian light cruiser  bombarded the Italian signal station at Cretaccio Island, while —with two torpedo boats—shelled Rimini, damaging a freight train. The destroyer  attacked the signal station near Torre di Mileto. The light cruiser , a destroyer and two torpedo boats entered Corsini Channel and shelled an Italian torpedo boat station, another semaphore station, and few batteries of coastal artillery.

The light cruiser —supported by four destroyers—ran into the Italian destroyer Turbine, in a pitched battle south of Pelagosa. The destroyer  shelled the railway embankment near Manfredonia while the destroyer  shelled the Manfredonia railway station. Finally Austro-Hungarian flying boats dropped ordnance on Venice and seaplane hangars at Chiaravalle.

Heavy damage was inflicted by the Austrian navy, and 63 people, both Italian military and civilian personnel, died in Ancona alone. The dome of Ancona Cathedral was damaged, too. Austrian casualties were light. The war in the Adriatic Sea continued, culminating in a large Allied blockade to prevent the Austro-Hungarian fleet from leaving the Adriatic. The "Otranto Barrage" would be raided by the Austro-Hungarians several times throughout the war, but major Austro-Hungarian warships rarely left the bases after this raid.

Notes

Bibliography

External links 
 Serbia, Balkans & Macedonia 1914–18
 Combined Operations in the Adriatic, 1915–18
 Tegetthoff class dreadnoughts – the primary online source for this topic since 1998
 Austro-Hungarian Navy

Ancona
Ancona
Ancona
Ancona
Ancona
May 1915 events
History of Ancona